Gone in 60 Seconds (also known as Gone in Sixty Seconds) is a 2000 American action heist film starring Nicolas Cage, Angelina Jolie, Giovanni Ribisi, Christopher Eccleston, Robert Duvall, Vinnie Jones, Delroy Lindo, Chi McBride, and Will Patton. The film was directed by Dominic Sena, written by Scott Rosenberg, and produced by Jerry Bruckheimer. The film is a loose remake of the 1974 H. B. Halicki film of the same name.

The film was shot throughout Los Angeles and Long Beach, California. It was released on June 9, 2000, by Buena Vista Pictures (through its Touchstone Pictures label). Upon release, Gone in 60 Seconds received generally negative reviews from critics, with criticism for its writing, its direction, as well as the acting and the action sequences. Despite the critical response, the film grossed $237 million against an estimated production budget of $90 million.

Plot

Car thief Kip Raines works with his gang to steal fifty high-end cars for Raymond Calitri, a British gangster in Long Beach, California. After stealing a Porsche 996 from a showroom, Kip unwittingly leads the police to his crew's warehouse, forcing the thieves to flee. Detectives Castlebeck and Drycoff impound the stolen cars and open an investigation. Atley Jackson, Calitri's associate, reaches out to Kip's older brother Randall "Memphis" Raines, a notorious but reformed car thief. Memphis meets with Calitri, who has kidnapped Kip and intends to kill him in a car crusher. Memphis agrees to steal the fifty cars within 72 hours, and Kip is released; Calitri warns that if the cars are not delivered on time, Kip will be killed.

Memphis visits his mentor Otto Halliwell and they assemble a crew of old associates: Donny Astricky, now a driving instructor; Sphinx, a mute mortician; and Sara "Sway" Wayland, a mechanic and bartender. Kip and his crew volunteer to help, and the group tracks down the cars, giving each a code name; Memphis insists on saving a 1967 Ford Shelby GT500, dubbed "Eleanor"—which he has attempted to steal before—for last. While scouting the cars, he and Kip narrowly avoid being killed by a rival gang. Hoping to deliver the cars before they can be traced, the crew plans to steal all fifty cars in one night.

Castlebeck and Drycoff learn that Kip bribed a Mercedes dealership employee to order laser-cut transponder keys, enabling the detectives to stakeout the Mercedes cars on the crew's list. A member of Kip's crew impulsively steals a Cadillac Eldorado not on the list, and the crew discovers a stash of heroin in the trunk. Castlebeck arrives, forcing the crew to distract him while they dispose of the drugs. He leaves, having ascertained that the heist is happening that night.

The crew sets their heist in motion, stealing the various cars and delivering them to Atley on the docks. As they prepare to use the transponder keys to steal the Mercedes cars, Memphis spots Castlebeck and Drycoff watching from a surveillance van. Abandoning the cars under surveillance, the crew breaks into the police impound lot, distracting the guard and stealing the Mercedes cars originally stolen by Kip's crew; the plan is hampered temporarily when Otto's dog eats, and eventually passes, the keys. Memphis and Sway rekindle their past romance while stealing a Lamborghini Diablo. Castlebeck and Drycoff return to the warehouse seized from Kip's crew. Having found pieces of a broken blacklight lamp, the detectives discover the crew's list of fifty cars written in ultraviolet-sensitive paint. With too many cars to track, Castleback focuses on the Shelby GT500, knowing Memphis will steal it last, and determines the location of the only 1967 Shelby in the area. When the crew steals a Cadillac Escalade, security is alerted, and a member of Kip's crew is injured. Memphis steals Eleanor just as the detectives arrive and leads police on a chase through the city and into a shipyard. Reaching the Vincent Thomas Bridge, blocked by an accident, Memphis jumps Eleanor off the ramp of a tow truck and lands on the other side, evading the police.

Memphis arrives at Calitri's junkyard twelve minutes late, and Calitri refuses to accept the slightly damaged Shelby, ordering his men to crush the car and kill Memphis. Kip and Atley use the junkyard crane to knock out the henchmen, and an armed Calitri pursues Memphis into the warehouse as the detectives arrive. Calitri prepares to shoot Castlebeck, but Memphis kicks Calitri over a railing to his death. A grateful Castlebeck lets Memphis go free, and Memphis tells him where to find the container ship full of stolen cars.

The crew celebrates with a barbecue, and Kip reveals that he has bought Memphis a dilapidated 1967 Shelby GT500 which Memphis also calls "Eleanor", which Otto promises to restore. Memphis invites Sway on a ride, but the car breaks down just as they drive away.

Cast

Cars featured
The 50 cars, stolen in the film, are listed below. They are listed in the same order as seen in the film; by year and model, along with their respective codenames.

Production

In 1995, Denice Shakarian Halicki entered into a license contract to produce the remake with Disney and Jerry Bruckheimer. Filming began in 1999, with Halicki as Executive Producer.

The film's trailer was narrated by Melissa Disney. The film is widely credited as one of the first major movies to employ a female trailer voice.

Soundtrack

A soundtrack containing a blend of rock, electronic, and hip hop music was released on June 6, 2000 by the Island Def Jam Music Group. It peaked at no. 69 on the Billboard 200.

An album containing only Trevor Rabin's instrumental music for the film was also released in 2000 (subtitled "Original Motion Picture Score").

Release

Box office
Gone in 60 Seconds premiered on June 9, 2000. In its opening weekend, the film grossed $25.3 million from 3,006 US theaters, ranking number one at the box office, beating Mission: Impossible 2. By the end of the film's theatrical run, it had grossed $101.6 million domestically and $135.6 million internationally, comprising a total gross revenue for the film of $237.2 million worldwide.

Due to its high production and marketing costs, it is estimated the film lost the studio about $90 million, although due to Hollywood accounting, Disney wrote it down as a $212 million loss.

Critical reception
Review aggregator Rotten Tomatoes reports that 25% out of 138 reviews gave the film a positive review, with an average rating of 4.40/10. The website's critical consensus reads: "Even though Oscar-bearers Nicolas Cage, Angelina Jolie, and Robert Duvall came aboard for this project, the quality of Gone in 60 Seconds is disappointingly low. The plot line is nonsensical, and even the promised car-chase scenes are boring". On Metacritic, the film has a weighted average score of 35 out of 100, based on 34 critics, indicating "generally unfavorable reviews". Audiences polled by CinemaScore gave the film an average grade of "B+" on an A+ to F scale.

At the 2000 Stinkers Bad Movie Awards, the film won the awards for Worst Screenplay for a Film That Grossed over $100 Million Using Hollywood Math and Most Intrusive Musical Score. Angelina Jolie received a nomination for Worst On-Screen Hairstyle but lost to John Travolta and Forest Whitaker for Battlefield Earth.

References

External links

 
 
 
 
 	
 
 

2000 films
2000 action thriller films
2000s chase films
2000s heist films
American action thriller films
American chase films
Remakes of American films
American heist films
Films scored by Trevor Rabin
Films about automobiles
Films directed by Dominic Sena
Films produced by Jerry Bruckheimer
Films with screenplays by Scott Rosenberg
Films set in Los Angeles
Films shot in Los Angeles
Films shot in Hamilton, Ontario
Touchstone Pictures films
2000s English-language films
2000s American films